Pentti Karl Isak Larvo (né Lindsten; 12 December 1908 – 1 May 1954) was a Finnish former footballer who played as a midfielder for the Finland national football team. He also represented his nation at the 1936 Summer Olympics in Berlin.

Career statistics

International

References

External links
 

1908 births
1954 deaths
Finnish footballers
Footballers at the 1936 Summer Olympics
Finland international footballers
Association football midfielders